Pahari Mandir is a temple located in hilltop in Ranchi  the capital of Jharkhand. The temple is dedicated to Shiva.  This temple is located at 2140 feet above sea level and 350 feet above the ground. To reach the temple one has to climb 468 steps. The entire Ranchi city can be seen from the temple. Lord Shiva is worshiped in linga form in the hill temple. There is a large crowd of Shiva devotees come here during the month of Shivaratri and Sawan.

The story of the hill temple of Ranchi, the capital of Jharkhand, is very interesting. This temple of Lord Shiva situated on the mountain was in the possession of the British before the independence of the country and they used to hang the Freedom Fighters here. Since Independence, the national flag is also hoisted with Independence Day and Republic Day along with religious flags on this temple. This is the first temple in the country where the tricolor is hoisted.

This temple of Lord Shiva, located 7 km from Ranchi railway station, is known as Pahari Temple. The old name of the Pahari Baba temple was Tiriburu, which later changed to 'Hanging Garry' in British times, because Freedom Fighters were hanged here under the British rule.

After independence, the first tricolor flag was hoisted here in Ranchi, which was hoisted by a freedom fighter Krishna Chandra Das of Ranchi. He hoisted the tricolor in memory and honor of the martyred Freedom Fighters here. Since that time, the tricolor is hoisted here on Independence Day and Republic Day every year. There is a stone in the hill temple, on which the message of freedom of the country is written on the midnight of August 14 and 15, 1947.

References

Hindu temples in Jharkhand